Rödelheim is a quarter of Frankfurt am Main, Germany. It is part of the Ortsbezirk Mitte-West and is subdivided into the Stadtbezirke Rödelheim-Ost and Rödelheim-West.

There are a number of celebrities who have established their base in Rödelheim, including Rödelheim Hartreim Projekt, Mathias Barbosa and Sabrina Setlur.

For many centuries and until the Nazi era, it was a major center for the printing and export of Hebrew books. Wolf Heidenheim and Seligman Baer, two highly prominent Hebrew grammarians and masoretic scholars of the modern period, both published in Rödelheim.

In 2015 the skeletons of 200 French soldiers that had died in 1813 were discovered here.

References

Districts of Frankfurt
Jews and Judaism in Frankfurt